Andree Wiedener (born 11 March 1970) is a former professional footballer who played as a defender for SV Werder Bremen and Eintracht Frankfurt.

Honours
Werder Bremen
 European Cup Winners' Cup: 1991–92
 Bundesliga 1992–93
 DFL-Supercup: 1993
 DFB-Pokal: 1990–91, 1993–94, 1998–99
 UEFA Intertoto Cup: 1998
 DFB-Ligapokal finalist: 1999

References

1970 births
Living people
People from Helmstedt
Footballers from Lower Saxony
Association football defenders
German footballers
SV Werder Bremen players
SV Werder Bremen II players
Eintracht Frankfurt players
Bundesliga players
2. Bundesliga players
West German footballers